Glaucotes yuccivorus is a species of longhorn beetles of the subfamily Lamiinae, and the only species in the genus Glaucotes. It was described by Fall in 1907.

References

Acanthocinini
Beetles described in 1907
Monotypic Cerambycidae genera